John Hendrickson may refer to:
 John H. Hendrickson (1872–1925), American sport shooter 
 John T. Hendrickson Jr. (1923–1999), American politician in the New Jersey General Assembly
 John Hendrickson (businessman), American businessman
 Jack Hendrickson (born 1936), Canadian ice hockey player